The Mire is a 2018 Polish-language television series starring Dawid Ogrodnik, Andrzej Seweryn and Zofia Wichłacz.

Synopsis

Series 1 (2018)
A local politician and a prostitute are killed in a small town. A journalist starts digging into the case, while also searching for things from his past.

Series 2 (2021)
A suspicious flood investigation in a small town intersects with World War II events. Both police and journalists get involved.

Episodes

Episodes The Mire

Episodes The Mire '97

Cast 
 Dawid Ogrodnik as Piotr Zarzycki
 Andrzej Seweryn as Witold Wanycz
 Zofia Wichłacz as Teresa Zarzycka
 Magdalena Walach as Helena Grochowiak
 Agnieszka Zulewska as Nadia
 Zbigniew Walerys as Zbigniew Brynski
 Patrick Boylan as Piotr Zarzycki
 Dennis Kleinman as Zbigniew Brynski
 Piotr Fronczewski as Hotel manager
 Ireneusz Czop as Prosecutor
 Jacek Beler as Militiaman Marek Kulik
 Dariusz Chojnacki as Journalist Koledowicz
 Jan Cieciara as Karol Wronski
 Nel Kaczmarek as Justyna Drewiczówna
 Michal Kaleta as Kazimierz Drewicz
 Janusz Lagodzinski as Journalist Stanislaw Warwas

Release 
The Mire was released on August 18, 2018 on Showmax.

References

External links
 
 

2010s Polish television series
Polish-language television shows
Television shows set in Poland
2018 Polish television series debuts